Darvish Baqqal (also Romanized as Darvīsh Baqqāl; also known as Darvish Baghghal and Dashpakal) is a village in Sis Rural District, in the Central District of Shabestar County, East Azerbaijan Province, Iran. At the 2006 census, its population was 613, in 144 families.

References 

Populated places in Shabestar County